59 Productions is a Scottish design studio and production company that creates original story-telling experiences for audiences of all kinds. The offices of the company are located in London and New York City.

Origins 

59 Productions was founded in Edinburgh by Leo Warner and Mark Grimmer. Early projects include the video design for Stellar Quines Theatre Company's Sweet Fanny Adams in Eden (2003), followed by the video design for the recently formed National Theatre of Scotland's Roam (2006) and Black Watch (2006), which was featured at the Edinburgh Festival Fringe. Shortly after winning multiple awards for Black Watch, including a Critics' Circle Theatre Award, a South Bank Sky Arts Award, four Critics' Awards for Theatre in Scotland, four Laurence Olivier Awards, a New York Drama Critics' Circle Award, and several awards at Edinburgh Festivals, 59 Productions relocated to London. There they began a series of collaborations at the Royal National Theatre, causing critics to say that the company had "created an entirely new art form."

59's Leo Warner and Mark Grimmer were part of the original creative team for War Horse in 2007, which went on to win six Laurence Olivier Awards in London and five Tony Awards for the subsequent production on Broadway.

59 Productions undertook its first opera in 2007 at the English National Opera, providing the projection design for Philip Glass's Satyagraha, directed by Phelim McDermott and designed by Julian Crouch of Improbable theatre. This was the first of several collaborations with Improbable theatre, including the design for the Metropolitan Opera's 125th Anniversary Gala in 2009, which raised more than $10 million.

In 2012, Oscar-winning director Danny Boyle asked 59 Productions to provide the animation and projection design for the 2012 Summer Olympics opening ceremony, viewed by an audience of over a billion people. At around the same time, 59 was also asked to lead the design of the David Bowie is exhibition for the Victoria and Albert Museum, marking the company's expansion into the world of exhibition design. The exhibit was described as "brought to life by technology and united in sound and vision in a way rarely seen in a museum." The company was commissioned to "Light the Sails" at Sydney Opera House for the 2014 VIVID Live festival. In 2015 they were responsible for the projection design for the first-ever Broadway production of George Gershwin's An American in Paris (film). The production went on to win 4 Tony Awards, including Best Scenic Design of a Musical for Bob Crowley and 59 Productions.

In July 2016, 100 years to the day since William E. Boeing turned his attention to the thrilling and world-changing field of aviation, 59 Productions mounted an immersive show on a vast scale – The Boeing Centennial Projection Spectacular – a celebration of the Boeing company's centenary, for more than 80,000 spectators, across 30 performances, at Boeing Field in Seattle, Washington. The show featured an animated sequence projection-mapped onto the body of a Boeing 747, telling the history of the iconic aircraft, as well as a specially commissioned soundtrack by composer Jeff Beal.

In 2017, the company developed and produced their first self-initiated production, an adaptation of Paul Auster's City of Glass, written by Duncan Macmillan. City of Glass was a co-production with the Lyric Hammersmith, HOME Manchester and Karl Sydow. The production was described by The Daily Telegraph as a "Neo-noir thriller that rewrites the rulebook for theatre design."

In 2018, 59 Productions provided both set and projection design for The Last Ship, the Sting musical which tells the story of the shipbuilding industry in the North East of England. The production opened at Northern Stage before embarking on a UK tour. Other recent projects include the design of Marnie, an opera by Nico Muhly which transferred to the Metropolitan Opera after an initial run at the English National Opera in London. The company also designed large scale events in 2018 for both the BBC First Night of the Proms at The Royal Albert Hall, and the Edinburgh International Festival.

Alongside their work for the stage, 59 Productions also made two award-winning VR films in 2018, Grenfell: Our Home, a collaboration with Parable and Channel 4 which won the Audience Award at Sheffield Doc Fest; and Nothing To Be Written, commissioned by the BBC, winner of Best UK Experience at Raindance.  In November 2018, their film collaboration with composer Eric Whitacre and NASA, Deep Field, premiered at Kennedy Space Center.

Now employing 35 people worldwide, with offices in London and New York, 59 Productions works in set design, video projection design, exhibition and events design, film, theatre, and interactive production. The company expanded in 2016 to include an architecture department with a particular focus on design for performance environments, and an interest in developing forms of architectural expression which are fundamentally narratively led.

Selected productions 

 2018 - The Last Ship - 59 Productions provided set and projection design for this new production of Sting's musical about shipbuilding in the North East of England.
2018 - The Shadow Factory - 59 Productions provided set design and projection design for this new play by Howard Brenton at Nuffield Theatre Southampton 
2018 - Array - an animated artwork projection mapped onto the interior of Beech Street Tunnel in The Barbican, London, set to Karawane by composer Esa Pekka Salonen 
2017 - Reflections - an animated artwork projected onto the Guggenheim Museum Bilbao as part of the museum's 20th birthday celebrations.
2017 - City of Glass - a stage adaptation of Paul Auster's novella, co-produced by 59 Productions, the Lyric Hammersmith, HOME Manchester, and Karl Sydow.
2015—An American in Paris at the Palace Theatre (New York City) starring Robert Fairchild and Leanne Cope. Because the main character is an artist, the projections transform from simple line drawings to finished works of art, as they would in a sketchbook. The video design integrates with the staging and scenic elements and the fluid cast of dancers to recreate the Parisian streets where the story is set.
 2014—Lighting the Sails at Sydney Opera House for the VIVID Live festival. 59 was commissioned to create a bespoke animated film for projection onto the roof of the Sydney Opera House, tracing the evolution of the building from its design and construction.
 2014—Hedwig and the Angry Inch at the Belasco Theatre starring Neil Patrick Harris. 59 Productions' Ben Pearcy designed projections for the Tony-nominated show.
 2014—Les Misérables at the Imperial Theatre. For this new production of the musical, 59 created projections inspired by Victor Hugo's watercolors.
 2013—David Bowie is exhibit at the Victoria and Albert Museum. It was the first time that the V&A Museum asked a theatrical design company to lead the design of an exhibition. It includes over 300 objects, video installations, and set works, drawing on a range of influences to bring Bowie's creative and cultural impact to life.
 2012—2012 Summer Olympics opening ceremony. The 59 Productions team art directed the video content delivered to the Olympic Stadium, including to the four LED screens on the stadium roof and the "audience pixels"—a video surface with a 9-pixel LED panel mounted between every one of the 70,000 seats.
 2009—Al gran sole carico d'amore at the Salzburg Festival. Katie Mitchell directed Luigi Nono's opera with Leo Warner, creating a "live film" production in which action on stage and visual effects were simultaneously created, shot, and edited live, and relayed to a cinema screen above the stage.
 2007—War Horse at the Royal National Theatre. Based on a children's book by Michael Morpurgo, directed by Tom Morris and Marianne Elliott, the story was staged with life-size horse puppets created by Handspring Puppet Company and animation and projection design by 59 productions.
 2007—Satyagraha by the English National Opera. For the opera by Philip Glass with libretto by Constance DeJong, 59 designed the video projections, using large-scale text instead of surtitles and aesthetics from Mahatma Gandhi's newspaper Indian Opinion.
 2006—The Waves at the Royal National Theatre, based on the novel by Virginia Woolf. Leo Warner developed a mode of "live film-making" with director Katie Mitchell that evoked the stream of consciousness effect of the novel.
 2006—Black Watch for the National Theatre of Scotland. 59 Productions designed the video projections for this play about the famous Scottish regiment in Iraq, which started out at the Edinburgh Festival Fringe, but went on to tour Europe, North America, and Australia and Asia.
 2006—Roam by Grid Iron at the Edinburgh Airport. 59 created CG and film content and designed the technical systems for the delivery of video in this show, including a mock-up of a live news report describing Edinburgh's descent into civil war.
 2003—Sweet Fanny May Adams in Eden produced by the Stellar Quines Theatre Company in a garden. 59 Productions' video was used for scenography and narrative purposes in this outdoor promenade production.

Selected tours 

 2011–2014—War Horse. After its successful run at the Royal National Theatre, the production won five Tony Awards on Broadway, including Best Play and Best Design. The show also toured in the UK & Ireland, North America, Holland, Germany, and South Africa.
 2010—Jónsi-Go Live World Tour. 59 conceived, designed, and produced the stage show for Jónsi's 2010 tour of North America, Europe, Australia and Japan.
 2009–2014—The new, redesigned version of Les Misérables has toured the UK, Japan, Korea, Spain, and Australia.
 2008—The Waves, which started at the Royal National Theatre, toured the UK, North America, and Europe.
 2006–2011—Black Watch, which started at the National Theatre of Scotland, went on to tour the UK, the US, Canada, Australia, and New Zealand.

References

External links 
 59 Productions Official Website

Theatre production companies
Video production companies
Companies based in Edinburgh